Thomas St George (October 1738 –1 April 1785) was an Irish politician. He sat in the House of Commons of Ireland from 1776 to 1785 as a Member of Parliament (MP) for the borough of Clogher in County Tyrone.

References 

1738 births
1785 deaths
Irish MPs 1776–1783
Irish MPs 1783–1790
Members of the Parliament of Ireland (pre-1801) for County Tyrone constituencies